Ina Kaldani (born 7 August 1997) is a visually impaired Georgian Paralympic judoka. She won the silver medal in the women's 70 kg event at the 2020 Summer Paralympics held in Tokyo, Japan.

References 

1997 births
Living people
Place of birth missing (living people)
Female judoka from Georgia (country)
Judoka at the 2020 Summer Paralympics
Medalists at the 2020 Summer Paralympics
Paralympic medalists in judo